Hollogne-aux-Pierres is a village of Wallonia and a district of the municipality  of Grâce-Hollogne, located in the province of Liège, Belgium.

It was a municipality of its own before its fusion with Grâce-Berleur on July 10th 1970. 

It is in this area that the police, on 30 July 1950, opened fire on the inhabitants of Grâce-Berleur, killing four people. This sad event is the tragic element which led to the end of the Royal Question.

Former municipalities of Liège Province
Grâce-Hollogne